Martin Compston (born 8 May 1984) is a Scottish actor and former professional footballer. He played Anti-Corruption Unit Detective Inspector Steve Arnott in the BBC drama Line of Duty, Liam in Ken Loach's Sweet Sixteen, Paul Ferris in The Wee Man, Ewan Brodie in Monarch of the Glen and Dan Docherty in The Nest.

Early life and football career 
Born to a Catholic family, Compston, the younger of two sons, was brought up in Greenock, Scotland, and attended St Columba's High School in neighbouring Gourock.

A promising footballer, he was a youth player with Aberdeen as a teenager, and after leaving school signed for his local professional club Greenock Morton. Compston made two first-team appearances in the 2001–02 season, in which the team was relegated to the Third Division. In both matches he appeared as a substitute and Morton lost 4–0, to Alloa Athletic and Queen of the South. After leaving Morton, he briefly played in junior football for Greenock Juniors.

Acting career 
Having never acted before, Compston successfully auditioned for the lead role in Ken Loach's Sweet Sixteen, which was being filmed locally. The film's success at the Cannes Film Festival gave him instant celebrity status in Scotland. Both he and his co-star William Ruane were nominated for Most Promising Newcomer at the British Independent Film Awards, with Compston winning the category.

He had a regular role in the BBC TV serial Monarch of the Glen. He then appeared in three films: A Guide to Recognizing Your Saints (Jury Prize and Best Ensemble Cast at the Sundance Festival) with Robert Downey, Jr.; Red Road (Jury Prize at Cannes), shot in Scotland with Kate Dickie and Tony Curran, for which he was nominated as Best Supporting Actor at the Scottish BAFTAs; and True North with Peter Mullan and Gary Lewis, for which he was nominated as Best Actor at the British Independent Film Awards.

Compston starred in the 2010 film Soulboy, alongside Craig Parkinson, playing the role of Joe McCain. He also made a cameo appearance in a low-budget web series, Night is Day.

Compston appeared in The View's music video for "Grace" and "How Long".

In 2012, Compston starred in the lead role of Detective Sergeant Steve Arnott, a detective on an anti-corruption squad, in the BBC police drama Line of Duty, acting alongside Craig Parkinson once more. In the same year, he also starred in the violent thriller Piggy. Going back to his Scottish roots, he then appeared in the lead role in The Wee Man, directed by Ray Burdis, a film depicting the life of the Glasgow gangster Paul Ferris. It was released in the UK in January 2013.

In April 2013, Compston starred in the ITV miniseries The Ice Cream Girls. He appeared as Roy James in The Great Train Robbery.

In 2014, 2016, 2017, 2019 and 2021, Compston reprised his lead role of Detective Sergeant Steve Arnott in five more series of police drama Line of Duty, which moved from BBC Two to BBC One at the start of its fourth series.

In 2016, he starred in the three-part Scottish television series In Plain Sight as serial murderer Peter Manuel. In 2020, he starred alongside Sophie Rundle in the television series The Nest.

In 2021, Compston was cast to star as Fulmer Hamilton in the Amazon Prime Video thriller The Rig, which was released in January 2023.

In March 2022, Compston starred in Our House. The drama series is based on the novel Our House by Louise Candlish.

Personal life
Compston married American actress Tianna Chanel Flynn in 2016. As of 2020, they reside in Las Vegas.

In June 2022, Compston was forced to deny allegations of singing sectarian lyrics, after videos surfaced on social media of him on stage during a Celtic FC supporter function in Las Vegas.

Compston is a supporter of the Scottish National Party.

Filmography

Film

Television

References

External links

1984 births
Living people
People from Greenock
Scottish footballers
Aberdeen F.C. players
Greenock Morton F.C. players
Scottish male television actors
Scottish male film actors
Scottish Football League players
Association football midfielders
Scottish Junior Football Association players
Greenock Juniors F.C. players